Patrick Marcos de Sousa Freitas (born 9 April 1999), simply known as Patrick, is a Brazilian footballer who plays as a central defender for Portuguesa.

Club career
Patrick was born in Ferraz de Vasconcelos, São Paulo, and joined Portuguesa's youth setup in 2018, after representing Flamengo-SP and EC São Bernardo. He made his senior debut with the former on 3 March 2019, coming on as a late substitute for Cesinha in a 3–0 Campeonato Paulista Série A2 away win over Taubaté.

Patrick scored his first senior goal on 24 March 2019, netting the opener in a 2–1 home win over Votuporanguense. A backup option in his first years, he became a starter in the 2021 Série D.

Patrick helped Lusa to win the 2022 Paulista A2 as a starter, being named the best defender of the competition. On 20 April 2022, he renewed his contract until August 2025, and agreed to a loan deal with Série C side ABC; his new club confirmed the deal two days later.

Career statistics

Honours

Club
Portuguesa
Copa Paulista: 2020
Campeonato Paulista Série A2: 2022

Individual
Campeonato Paulista Série A2 Best XI: 2022

References

1999 births
Living people
Footballers from São Paulo (state)
Brazilian footballers
Association football defenders
Campeonato Brasileiro Série C players
Campeonato Brasileiro Série D players
Associação Portuguesa de Desportos players
ABC Futebol Clube players
People from Ferraz de Vasconcelos